Moisés Naím (born July 5, 1952) is a Venezuelan journalist and writer. He is a Distinguished Fellow at the Carnegie Endowment for International Peace. In 2013, the British magazine Prospect listed Naím as one of the world's leading thinkers. In 2014 and 2015, Dr. Naím was ranked among the top 100 influential global thought leaders by Gottlieb Duttweiler Institute (GDI) for his book The End of Power. "The End of Power" was also selected as the first book for followers of Mark Zuckerberg's 2015 book club to read.

Naím served as the editor-in-chief of Foreign Policy magazine for 14 years (1996-2010). Since 2012, he has directed and hosted Efecto Naím, a weekly televised news program on the economy and international affairs that airs throughout the Americas on NTN24. In 2011, he received the Ortega y Gasset Award for his important contribution to journalism in the Spanish language.

He is the former Minister of Trade and Industry for Venezuela, Director of its Central bank, and Executive Director of the World Bank.

Education
Moisés Naím studied at the Universidad Metropolitana in Caracas, Venezuela. Following his undergraduate studies, he attended the Massachusetts Institute of Technology, where he obtained both a master of science and doctorate degrees. His dissertation was titled, "The Political Economy of Regulating Multinational Corporations".

Public service
Naím was a professor of business strategy and industrial economics at Instituto de Estudios Superiores de Administración (IESA), Venezuela's leading business school and research center located in Caracas.  He also served as its Dean between 1979 and 1986.

From 1989 to 1990, Naím served as Venezuela's Minister of Trade and Industry, he wrote about this experience in his 1993 book, "Paper Tigers and Minotaurs" and spoke about it in an interview with journalist Mirtha Rivero.

Journalism career
Moisés Naím is the chief international columnist for El País, the most widely read newspaper in Spain. His column, "The Global Observer", is also published in Italy (La Repubblica), France (Slate.fr), and in the major newspapers of Latin America. For several years, he served as a contributing editor to The Atlantic.

Among other publications, Naím's work has appeared in: The New York Times, The Washington Post, The Financial Times, Newsweek, Time, Le Monde, Berliner Zeitung, and many more, making him one of today's most widely read columnists on international economics and geopolitics.

In 1996, Naím became the editor-in-chief of "Foreign Policy" magazine. Under his guidance, the magazine re-launched and won the National Magazine Awards for General Excellence three times. During this period, it transformed from an academic quarterly to a bimonthly glossy.

During his tenure, he spearheaded the change in format by introducing photography and art, increased the frequency of publication, launched editions in other languages, and the website ForeignPolicy.com.

In 2008, Naím successfully completed the sale of the magazine to the Washington Post group, though he remained editor-in-chief until 2010.

Published books
Naím is the author or editor of more than fifteen books on topics related to geopolitics, international economics, and economic development.

Naim's newest book "The Revenge of Power: How Autocrats Are Reinventing Politics for the 21st Century" was published in February 2022. 

Naím's book Dos Espías en Caracas ("Two Spies in Caracas") was released in Spanish in late 2018 and in English in the summer of 2021. It is a novel of espionage intertwined with a love story. 

In 2013, he released The End of Power: From Boardrooms to Battlefields and Churches to States, Why Being in Charge Isn't What It Used To Be (2013). In it he argues that power has become "easier to get, harder to use, and easier to lose" due to the demographic explosion, increase in geographic mobility, and a shift in cultural norms. Both the Financial Times and the Washington Post  named it one of the best books of 2013, and was widely reviewed. In 2015, it was selected by Facebook CEO Mark Zuckerberg as the inaugural book for the Mark Zuckerberg book club, a public resolution to read one new book every two weeks in 2015.

In 2005, his book Illicit: How Smugglers, Traffickers, and Copycats are Hijacking the Global Economy was selected by the Washington Post as one of the best non-fiction books of the year; it was published in 14 languages and is the basis of a documentary produced by National Geographic Film and Television in 2010.

Efecto Naím
Efecto Naím is a weekly television show that offers a unique vision of the changing world. As director and host, Naím presents brief reports on surprising global tendencies and interviews  most influential political, business, media, scientific, and cultural leaders. "Efecto Naím" airs throughout Latin America every Sunday via DirecTV NTN24.

Affiliations
Naím is the founder and chairman of the Group of Fifty and a member of the Council on Foreign Relations, the Inter-American Dialogue and the World Economic Forum amongst others.

Awards and recognition
 In 2017, Carnegie Endowment for International Peace designated him as a Distinguished Fellow (only three members of the institution have that rank). 
 In 2015, 2016 and 2017 the Gottlieb Duttweiler Institute ranked Naím among the top 100 most influential global thought leaders once again.
 In 2014, the Gottlieb Duttweiler Institute ranked Naím among the top 100 most influential global thought leaders for his work in The End of Power.
 In 2013, Naím was recognized as one of the world's leading thinkers by the British magazine Prospect. 
 In 2013, Naím received an honorary doctorate (honoris causa) from American University.
 In 2011, Naím was awarded the Ortega y Gasset Journalism Award, the most prestigious award for journalism in the Spanish language for lifetime achievement/career trajectory.
 Under his guidance as editor of the magazine for fourteen years (1996-2010), Foreign Policy won the National Magazine Award for General Excellence three times.
 In 2003, the Republic of Argentina honored Naím with the Order of May with the grade of Commander, one of the highest decorations the country presents for foreigners.
 In 1991, Francesco Cossiga, the President of Italy, honored Naim with the National Order of Merit, with the grade "Commendatore."
 In 1990, François Mitterrand, the President of France honored Naím with the National Order of Merit with the grade of Grand Officer (29 June 1991).
 In 1985, Moisés Naím was honored with the Order of Andres Bello from the Republic of Venezuela.

Publications

Books

References

External links
Official website
Author page for the Financial Times’ "The A-List"
PostGlobal Panelist

1952 births
Living people
Foreign policy writers
Academic staff of Instituto de Estudios Superiores de Administración
Libyan emigrants to Venezuela
Libyan Jews
Magazine editors
Massachusetts Institute of Technology alumni
Venezuelan expatriates in the United States
Venezuelan Jews
Venezuelan journalists
Venezuelan people of Libyan descent
Venezuelan politicians
Universidad Metropolitana alumni
Members of the Inter-American Dialogue
Industry ministers of Venezuela